Tourism in Portugal serves millions of international and domestic tourists. Tourists visit to see cities, historic landmarks, enjoy beaches, or religious sites. As of 2019, Portugal had 27 million visitors. The most popular destinations were Lisbon, Porto, the Algarve, the Portuguese Riviera, Madeira, Sintra, Óbidos and Fátima. The most popular with internationals were Lisbon, the Algarve and Northern Portugal. National tourists prefer Northern Portugal, followed by Central Portugal and the Algarve.

Statistics
In 2006, the country was visited by 7 million tourists, three million of which came from Spain. By 2018, the country was visited by 12.8 million international tourists.

In 2016, and compared to 2015, most tourists staying in hotels were attracted to Lisbon (6.3 million, up from 5.8), Porto and Northern Portugal (4.4 million, up from 3.9), the Algarve (4.2 million, up from 3.8), Central Portugal (3.2 million, up from 2.9 million), Madeira (1.5 million, up from 1.3), Alentejo (1.2 million, up from 1.1),  and the Azores (0.5 million, up from 0.4). The Algarve and Lisbon lead in overnight stays. In 2016, overnight stays grew significantly in other regions: the Azores (+21.1%), Northern Portugal (+14.4%), Alentejo (+12%), Central Portugal (+11.8%), and Madeira (+10.9%).

The following table presents the nationality of the largest demographic of tourists from 2017 to 2019:

In 2016, accounting international tourists, the most popular regions were Lisbon (4.4 million), Algarve (3 million), Northern Portugal (2.1 million), Central Portugal (1.2), Madeira (1.2), Alentejo 370,000 and the Azores. For national tourists the most popular regions were Northern Portugal (2.3), Central Portugal (2.0), Lisbon (1.9), the Algarve (1.2), Alentejo (0.8), Madeira (0.29), and the Azores (0.27).

The following table presents the nationality of the largest demographic of tourists by region in 2019:

Lisbon is, with Barcelona, one of the European cities leading in overnight stays. The urban areas of Porto and Northern Portugal, north of Douro River surpassed Madeira, in 2010, and the Algarve, in 2015, and became the second most visited destination in Portugal. In 2015, most tourists were Europeans, but also from the Americas and Asia. Sleeping in the country's hotels, the most numerous are the British, Spanish, French, Germans, Brazilians, the Dutch, Americans, Italians, and the Japanese, which not only want the sun and the beach, but mostly cultural ones, city breaks, gastronomy, nautical tourism, or business traveling.

Portugal won 14 "Oscars" of the tourism. The national tourism had 77 nominations and won a total of 14 awards in more than 10 European categories, surpassing Spain or Italy, at the gala of the World Travel Awards 2015, whose ceremony took place in Sardinia, Italy. CNN compared Lisbon and Porto head-to-head in order to find who has the best food, culture, old cafés and boutiques, nightlife, and the best beaches.

Travel guide giants Lonely Planet have designated Portugal as one of the top 3 countries to visit in 2018.

Tourism regions

Tourist hotspots in Portugal are Lisbon, Porto, the Algarve, Madeira, Sintra, Óbidos, Fátima, Coimbra and Azores, but the Portuguese government is currently developing new destinations: the Douro Valley, Porto Santo Island, and Alentejo.

Portugal has several other tourism regions such as Douro Sul, Templários, Dão-Lafões, Costa do Sol, Costa Azul, Planície Dourada, etc. Most of them are unknown to tourists and locals alike. As of 2007, these are being reorganized.

All these regions are grouped in tourism reference areas, which are widely known because these are the traditional regions:
Costa Verde in Norte Region — The Portuguese green coast comprises all the northern coast of Portugal from the estuary of the Minho River to the city of Porto.
Costa de Prata in Centro Region —  The Portuguese silver coast comprises from Porto to Lisbon. Fátima, Nazaré and Óbidos are 3 very important places.
Portuguese Riviera (Sintra, Cascais and Estoril)
Comporta — The northwestern coast of the Alentejo
Caparica Coast — The coast south of Lisbon, across the Tagus river
Montanhas —  Mountainous and interior regions of northern and central Portugal, namely Serra da Estrela and Trás-os-Montes.
Planícies —  The Portuguese plane region of Alentejo in the south.
Algarve — The southern coast of Portugal including the Golden Triangle.
Madeira — The Madeira islands.
Açores  — The Azores islands.

Tourist regions 
The main tourist regions can be broken-down into:

 the Greater Lisbon,
 the Greater Porto,
 the Algarve,
 the Alentejo,
 Central Portugal,
 Northern Portugal and
 the Portuguese Islands: Madeira and Azores.
 
Other tourist regions include Douro Sul, Templários, Dão-Lafões, Costa do Sol, Costa Azul, Planície Dourada, that are unknown to many tourists or visitors.

Most of these regions are grouped in tourism reference areas, which continue to be in a state of reorganization and evolution, some based on the traditional regions of Portugal: the Costa Verde (Green Coast); Costa da Prata (Silver Coast); Costa de Lisboa (Lisbon Coast); Montanhas (Mountains); Planícies (Plains); Algarve; and the islands of the archipelagos of Madeira and the Azores.

The Rooster of Barcelos is bought by many tourists as a souvenir. The legend of the Rooster of Barcelos tells the story of a dead rooster's miraculous intervention in proving the innocence of a man who had been falsely accused and sentenced to death. The story is associated with the 17th-century calvary that is part of the collection of the Archeological Museum located in Paço dos Condes, a gothic-style palace in Barcelos, a city in the Braga District of northwest Portugal.

The following table presents the number of visitors in each of the protected areas of Portugal, according to ICNF:

UNESCO World Heritage sites
 List of World Heritage Sites in Portugal

See also
 Seven Wonders of Portugal
 Tourism in Lisbon
 List of museums in Portugal
 List of Portuguese dishes
 Portuguese cuisine
 Portuguese Riviera

References

External links

 Portugal Official Tourism Website
 Algarve Official Tourism Website
 Center of Portugal
 Portugal Travel Guide
 

 
Portugal